Darryl Bryant (born  April 25, 1990) known also as Truck Bryant is an American professional basketball player. Standing at 1.87 m (6'1"), he plays at the shooting guard position. After playing four years of college basketball at West Virginia University, with the West Virginia Mountaineers, Bryant entered the 2012 NBA draft, but was not selected in the draft's two rounds.

High school career
Bryant played high school basketball at St. Raymond High School for Boys in Bronx, New York.

College career
Bryant played college basketball at West Virginia University, with the West Virginia Mountaineers, from 2008 to 2012. Under coach Bob Huggins, Bryant was one of the most stable players of the team during his time at West Virginia. At his senior year, Bryant went to average 19.4 points, 2.7 assists and 3 rebounds per game.

Professional career
After going undrafted at the 2012 NBA draft, Bryant began his pro career in Austria, playing in the Austrian league with Panthers Fürstenfeld in 2013. He then played in Czech Republic, with the Czech League club BC Kolín. The following year, he played in Italy for Mens Sana 1871 averaging 17.5 points, 3.1 rebounds and 3.7 assists per game.

On July 26, 2016, Bryant moved to Greece, where he joined the Greek League club PAOK. In late December 2016, he left PAOK. On January 9, 2017, he signed with Hungarian club Szolnoki Olaj. He left Szolnok after appearing in four games. On February 27, 2017, he signed with Kataja Basket Club.

On February 22, 2018, Bryant signed with Levski Lukoil of the Bulgarian NBL.

In December of 2018, Bryant moved to Rustavi in Georgian Basketball Super League but left the club after only five games. In January 2019, he signed with Goes Montevideo in Liga Uruguaya de Basketball .

References

External links
RealGM.com Profile
Eurobasket.com Profile
Draftexpress.com Profile

1990 births
Living people
American expatriate basketball people in Austria
American expatriate basketball people in the Czech Republic
American expatriate basketball people in Finland
American expatriate basketball people in Greece
American expatriate basketball people in Italy
American expatriate basketball people in Hungary
American expatriate basketball people in Qatar
American expatriate basketball people in Georgia (country)
American men's basketball players
Basketball players from New York City
BC Kolín players
BSC Fürstenfeld Panthers players
Mens Sana Basket players
P.A.O.K. BC players
Szolnoki Olaj KK players
West Virginia Mountaineers men's basketball players
Guards (basketball)